Barossus is a genus of beetles in the family Cerambycidae, containing the following species:

 Barossus cineraceus Fairmaire, 1893
 Barossus kauppi (Adlbauer, 2001)

References

Dorcasominae